During the 2005–06 Dutch football season AFC Ajax participated in the Eredivisie, the KNVB Cup and the UEFA Champions League. The first training took place on 3 July 2005. The traditional AFC Ajax Open Day was on 3 August 2005.

Pre-season
The first training for the 2005–06 season was held on 3 July 2005. In preparation for the new season, Ajax organized a training camp in De Lutte, Netherlands, at the De Thij Sportpark. During the pre-season, the squad from manager Danny Blind played friendly matches against DWV, WHC, Quick '20, HHC Hardenberg, Rijnsburgse Boys, Fortuna Sittard, Arminia Bielefeld and FC Omniworld. They then returned to Amsterdam to play Arsenal and Boca Juniors in the annual Amsterdam Tournament.

Player statistics
Appearances for competitive matches only

|-
|colspan="14"|Players sold or loaned out after the start of the season:

|}
As of 26 November 2011

Players by nationality

Team statistics

Eredivisie standings

Points by matchday

Total points by matchday

Standing by matchday

Goals by matchday

Overview
This is an overview of all the statistics for played matches in the season.

2005–06 team records

Top scorers

Placements

 Klaas-Jan Huntelaar finishes as top-scorer of the Eredivisie with 33 goals in 34 matches. (17 with Heerenveen / 16 with Ajax)
 Klaas-Jan Huntelaar is voted Player of the Year by the supporters of Ajax.
 Urby Emanuelson and Thomas Vermaelen are voted Talent of the Year by the supporters of Ajax.

Results
All times are in CEST

Johan Cruijff Schaal

Eredivisie

Play-offs
First round

Second round

KNVB Cup

UEFA Champions League

Play-off round

Group stage

Knockout stage

Round of 16

Amsterdam Tournament

Final standings of the LG Amsterdam Tournament 2005

Friendlies

Transfers

Summer
For a list of all Dutch football transfers in the summer window (1 July 2005 to 1 September 2005) please see List of Dutch football transfers summer 2005.

In
 The following players moved to AFC Ajax.

Out
 The following players moved from AFC Ajax.

Winter
For a list of all Dutch football transfers in the winter window (1 January 2006 to 1 February 2006) please see List of Dutch football transfers winter 2005–06.

In
 The following players moved to AFC Ajax.

Out
The following players moved from AFC Ajax.

External links
Ajax Amsterdam Official Website in Nederlandse
UEFA Website

References

Ajax
AFC Ajax seasons